Simon Rochon Cohen (born August 27, 1983), known professionally with the pseudonyms Siméo, Chaton, and Petit Cœur, is a French singer, songwriter and musician.

Biography 
He was registered at the age of 6 at the conservatory where he had the right to touch a musical instrument from the age of 10 years. The piano is his first instrument, then follow guitar, bass, various brass, wood and percussion. He made his first compositions in several groups of amateur music during his adolescence and published his first album, Les idées bleues, in 2003, at the age of 20 years.

He traveled Europe with nearly 500 concerts alone on stage, assisted by his machines, between 2003 and 2009. In March and April 2009, he toured Asia (Simeo Asian Tour 2009) through 6 countries: Vietnam, Cambodia, Thailand, Brunei, Burma and Bangladesh. Then another in China in 2012.

In 2018, he released his fourth album, which earned him a critical recognition of the Inrocks. He is also noted for his resumption of a Celine Dion's title written by Jean-Jacques Goldman, Pour que tu m'aimes encore. 0

Discography

Studio albums 

 Les Idées bleues (2003)
 Envie (2006)
 Sous un ciel trois étoiles (2009)
 Possible (2018)
 Brune Platine (2019)
 Princesse Pigalle (2019)
 Héros (2021)
 Vie (2021)
 Populaire (2021)
 Violent Beau (2022)
 Minute (2022)
 Le Geste (2022)
 Château Marcadet (2022)
 Palace (2023)

References

Sources

External links
Official website

21st-century French singers
1983 births
Living people